Centennial Lakes Park is a  park and man-made pond located in the southeast portion of Edina, Minnesota, United States.

In addition, the park features a miniature golf course. There is a wide space for lawn bowling and paddleboats can be rented as well.

See also
List of contemporary amphitheatres

External links

Edina, Minnesota
Regional parks in Minnesota
Protected areas of Hennepin County, Minnesota